The women's tournament of handball at the 2013 Mediterranean Games were held from 23 to 30 June 2013 at the Yüreğir Serinevler Arena in Adana, Turkey.

Format
Ten teams are divided into two preliminary groups. Each group have five teams.
The top 2 teams from each group will qualify for Semifinals, other teams will qualify for the placement matches.
Winners of the Semifinals contested the gold medal game and the losers the bronze medal game.

Participating teams

Group stage

Group A

Matches

Group B

Playoffs

Semifinals

9th/10th classification

7th/8th classification

5th/6th classification

Bronze medal match

Final

References

Women's
Mediterranean Games